Fenwick is a masculine given name which may refer to:

People
Fenwick W. English (born 1939), American educational leader, author, professor, editor and auditor
Fenwick Lionel Kelly (1863–1944), Canadian politician
Fenwick Lansdowne (1937–2008), Canadian wildlife painter
Fenwick Lawson (born 1932), English sculptor
Fenwick Skrimshire (1774–1855), English physician and naturalist
Fenwick Smith, American flutist, assistant principal flutist of the Boston Symphony Orchestra and principal flutist of the Boston Pops from 1978 to 2006
R. Fenwick Taylor (1849–1926), American lawyer and politician
Michael Fenwick Briggs (1926–2017), British businessman

Fictional characters
Fenwick Travers, antihero of novels by Raymond M. Saunders
Fenwick Babbitt, character portrayed by American comic Jackie Gleason

Masculine given names